Our Lady of the Lake Catholic High School is a parochial, Roman Catholic high school in St. Joseph, Michigan.  It is located in the Roman Catholic Diocese of Kalamazoo.  Prior to the 2022-2023 school year, the school was named Lake Michigan Catholic High School.

Our Lady of the Lake Catholic High School was formed by the merger of St. John and St. Joseph Catholic Schools in 1969.  Since then, the high school has been part of a PS-12 school system serving Southwestern Michigan in the Catholic education tradition.  The school system is supported by the parishes of St. John, St. Bernard, and St. Joseph and the Twin-City Area Catholic School Fund, Inc.

Our Lady of the Lake Catholic Schools are a part of the educational system established by the Diocese of Kalamazoo, MI and are subject to the policies of the Diocesan Office of Schools.  The school is accredited by the Michigan Association of Non-Public Schools. In accordance with Title IX compliance, Our Lady of the Lake Catholic Schools do not discriminate on the basis of sex, religious affiliation, race, color, physical challenges, or national origin in admissions or employment opportunities.

Athletics
Basketball
 Girls state Championships: 1988

Notes and references

Roman Catholic Diocese of Kalamazoo
Educational institutions established in 1969
Catholic secondary schools in Michigan
Schools in Berrien County, Michigan
1969 establishments in Michigan